La Gardette - Bassens - Carbon Blanc tram stop is the terminus of the northern branch of line A of the Tramway de Bordeaux. It opened on 31 June 2008, when the line was extended from Lormont-Lauriers . The stop is located in the commune of Lormont and is operated by the TBC.

For most of the day on Mondays to Fridays, trams run every ten minutes in both directions through the stop. Services run less frequently in the early morning, late evenings, weekends and public holidays.

References

Bordeaux tramway stops
Tram stops in Lormont
Railway stations in France opened in 2008